Marcelino Garcia (born January 21, 1952) is a former boxer who represented the United States Virgin Islands. He competed in the men's welterweight event at the 1976 Summer Olympics. At the 1976 Summer Olympics, he lost to Ju Seok-Kim of South Korea. Garcia also represented the United States Virgin Islands at the 1975 Pan American Games.

References

1952 births
Living people
United States Virgin Islands male boxers
Olympic boxers of the United States Virgin Islands
Boxers at the 1976 Summer Olympics
Pan American Games competitors for the United States Virgin Islands
Boxers at the 1975 Pan American Games
Place of birth missing (living people)
Welterweight boxers